Thomas J. Abinanti (born December 28, 1946) is an American politician, lawyer, and member of the New York State Assembly from Greenburgh, New York. A member of the Democratic Party, Abinanti was elected to the State Assembly in 2010 to replace Assemblyman Richard Brodsky, and represents central Westchester County, New York.

Early life and education
Born in Brooklyn, Abinanti graduated from Xaverian High School in 1964. He received a B.A. in political science from Fordham College in 1968 and a J.D. from New York University School of Law in 1972.

Career
Abinanti moved to Westchester in 1975 and lived in Greenburgh until 2011 when he moved to Pleasantville. He was legislative counsel to a Congressman and staff counsel to the Speaker of the New York State Assembly and various Assembly committees. He served as a prosecuting attorney for the villages of Ardsley and Dobbs Ferry. Abinanti has taught continuing legal education courses for Pace Law School and courses in state and local government as an adjunct professor at Mercy College.

Abinanti served as Greenburgh Town Councilman twice (1980–1984 and 1990–1991). Abinanti was elected as Westchester County Legislator ten times. For almost twenty years (1992–2010),[2] he represented the 12th District on the Westchester County Board of Legislators, which included the villages of Irvington, Dobbs Ferry, Hastings, Ardsley, and much of unincorporated Greenburgh, including East Irvington, Central Greenburgh, Hartsdale and Edgemont. On the County Board, he served as Majority Leader for three terms after the Democrats first assumed the majority on the Board for the first time in the history of the Westchester Legislature.

State Assembly
Abinanti was first elected as a member of the New York State Assembly in 2010 and has served five terms.
He represents the 92nd District of the State Assembly which includes the towns of Greenburgh and Mount Pleasant, the villages of Ardsley, Elmsford, Dobbs Ferry, Hastings-on-Hudson, Irvington, Tarrytown, Pleasantville, and Sleepy Hollow, as well as parts of the Village of Briarcliff. 
He has served as chair of the Assembly Committee on Libraries, the Assembly Committee on Investigations, and the Assembly Committee on Banks.

In 1996, Abinanti was defeated in a run for the 35th District of the New York State Senate against the incumbent Republican State Senator Nicholas A. Spano.

2020 Election Controversy 
Three acquaintances of Abinanti filed identical objections to the petition of his opponent, Jennifer A. Williams. Out of many objections, the only one deemed valid was that Williams used the term "New York State Assembly, District 92," to describe the office she was running for. They alleged that this was not sufficient in clearly describing the office Williams was running for. On April 13, Williams was struck from the ballot because of the objection.

Williams then brought the case to court once more, Abinanti serving as co-counsel to defend his acquaintances. Williams claimed that she did sufficiently explain the office she is running for. Despite the Westchester Board of Elections, siding with Abinanti in the second round of hearings, Judge Gretchen Walsh ruled in Williams' favor. As per Judge Walsh's order Abinanti will be running opposed in a primary for the Assembly for the first time. Williams and Abinanti both ran for membership in the New York State Assembly, representing the 92nd District, and both appeared on the ballot for the June 2020 primary.

Personal life
Abinanti is married to Janet Longo-Abinanti and they have two children. He is an advocate for people with autism. His son Justin has autism, where he advocates for rights of people with disabilities and daily living for those who have autism.

References

External links
New York State Assembly website
Abinanti for Assembly website

Living people
Democratic Party members of the New York State Assembly
Xaverian High School alumni
Fordham University alumni
New York University School of Law alumni
Legislators from Westchester County, New York
People from Greenburgh, New York
21st-century American politicians
Mercy College (New York) faculty
1946 births